The  is a training unit belonging to Air Training Command of the Japan Air Self-Defense Force based at Nyutabaru Air Base in Miyazaki Prefecture, Japan. It consists of the 23rd Flying Training Squadron.

Aircraft operated
 Mitsubishi F-15J/DJ (2000-)
 Kawasaki T-4 (2000-)

References

Units of the Japan Air Self-Defense Force